Eric Bertrand Bailly (born 12 April 1994) is an Ivorian professional footballer who plays for Ligue 1 club Marseille, on loan from  club Manchester United, and the Ivory Coast national team. Although he mainly plays as a centre-back, he can also play as a right-back.

Bailly began his professional career at Spain's Espanyol before transferring to Villarreal. He spent two seasons at the club before signing for Manchester United in June 2016.

He made his international debut for the Ivory Coast in 2015 and helped them win that year's Africa Cup of Nations. He played in two further African tournaments and the 2020 Olympics.

Club career

Espanyol
Born in Bingerville, Bailly joined Espanyol's youth system in December 2011, aged 17. Bailly was spotted by Espanyol's Emilio Montagut after taking part in a youth tournament in Burkina Faso, organised by Spanish company Promoesport. Some records of that time erroneously list his name as Eric Bertrand (his middle name misinterpreted as his paternal surname). He only received a work permit in October of the following year, and made his senior debut in the 2013–14 campaign with the reserves, in Segunda División B.

On 5 October 2014, Bailly made his first-team – and La Liga – debut, coming on as a late substitute in a 2–0 home win against Real Sociedad. He was promoted to the main squad shortly after.

Villarreal
On 29 January 2015, Bailly signed a five-and-a-half-year contract with fellow La Liga team Villarreal for a €5.7 million fee, mainly as a replacement to Arsenal-bound Gabriel Paulista. He made his debut for the Yellow Submarine on 22 February, starting in a 1–0 home win against Eibar.

On 19 March, Bailly made his UEFA Europa League debut, starting and being sent off in a 2–1 away loss against Sevilla.

On 18 October 2015, Bailly was sent off shortly after the interval in a 2–1 loss to Celta de Vigo at Estadio El Madrigal. He made seven appearances as the team reached the last four of the 2015–16 UEFA Europa League; on 22 October he scored his first career goal and only one for the team, to conclude a 4–0 home group win over Dinamo Minsk.

Manchester United

2016–17 season: Debut campaign

On 8 June 2016, Bailly joined Premier League side Manchester United for a reported fee of £30 million, signing a four-year contract, with the option of an additional two. He was the first player signed by their new manager José Mourinho.

He made his competitive debut on 7 August in a 2–1 win against Leicester City at Wembley Stadium to win the FA Community Shield, and was named man of the match. He was again named man of the match on his Premier League debut a week later, a 3–1 win at Bournemouth.

He was voted Manchester United's Player of the Month for August 2016. He said to MUTV, "The Man-of-the-Match awards are something I hadn’t thought about, but I got them through the hard work I have put in. I hope to see more of that in the weeks ahead of us." On 23 October 2016, Bailly was substituted off in the 52nd minute after suffering a serious knee injury during the 4–0 loss at Chelsea. He made 11 appearances as the Red Devils won the Europa League, and was named in the Squad of the Season.

2017–18 season
On 19 August 2017, Bailly scored the first league goal of his club career, Manchester United's first in a 4–0 away win over Swansea City, following up after Paul Pogba's header came back off the underside of the crossbar.

On 8 November 2017, Bailly suffered an ankle injury, and he was sidelined for around 100 days and returned to action on 17 February 2018, coming on as a substitute for Romelu Lukaku in the final 90-minute added additional time in a 2–0 win over Huddersfield in the FA Cup. He went on and made a total of 18 appearances and scored one goal in all competitions at the end of the season.

2018–present: Injury-hit campaigns
Bailly's injury problems continued in the 2018–19 season, which caused him to only feature in 18 games in all competitions, with 12 appearances coming in from the Premier League. He was sent off on 30 December 2018 in a 4–1 home win over AFC Bournemouth for a foul on Ryan Fraser, for which he was criticised by manager Ole Gunnar Solskjær.

In July 2019, Bailly was ruled out for a further four months after suffering a knee injury in a pre-season friendly against Tottenham Hotspur in China. On 10 January 2020, he made his return from injury by playing in a game with Manchester United's under-23 team against Newcastle United. On 17 January 2020, Bailly signed a two-year contract extension with United, tying him to the club until the end of the 2021–22 season. He made a comeback in the Premier League and played his first match of the season on 17 February, featuring for the whole 90 minutes in a 2–0 win against Chelsea.

He made his 100th appearance for the club in a 1–1 draw against AC Milan in the Europa League at Old Trafford. On 26 April 2021, he signed a contract to 2024, with the option of one more year.

On 23 September 2021, Bailly made his first appearance of the campaign in an EFL Cup tie against West Ham United, which Manchester United lost 1–0.

Marseille (loan)
On 24 August 2022, Bailly joined Ligue 1 club Marseille on loan for the duration of the 2022–23 season.

International career

On 29 December 2014, Bailly was included in Hervé Renard's 23-man squad for the 2015 Africa Cup of Nations. He made his debut on 11 January 2015, in a friendly against Nigeria, and appeared in all six matches during the competition as his side were crowned champions. He was again named in the Elephants' squad for the 2017 Africa Cup of Nations in Gabon, playing the entirety of all three matches in a campaign which ended in the group stage.

On 12 October 2018, Bailly scored his first international goal in a 4–0 win over the Central African Republic in a 2019 Africa Cup of Nations qualifier at the Stade Bouaké. The following April he suffered a knee injury, ruling him out of the finals in Egypt.

On 3 July 2021, Bailly was selected as one of the designated overaged players in the Ivory Coast Olympic team for the 2020 Summer Olympics. Bailly made his Olympics debut in a 2–1 win against Saudi Arabia on 22 July. He made four appearances in the tournament and scored one goal, in a quarter-final defeat against Spain.

At the 2021 Africa Cup of Nations, held at the start of the following year in Cameroon, Bailly suffered a head injury at the end of a 2–2 draw with Sierra Leone in the second game, thereby missing the third against Algeria. He wore a scrum cap in the goalless last 16 match against Egypt and was the only player to miss in the penalty shootout, with his shot being saved by substitute goalkeeper Mohamed Abou Gabal.

Career statistics

Club

International

Ivory Coast score listed first, score column indicates score after each Bailly goal

Honours
Manchester United
EFL Cup: 2016–17
FA Community Shield: 2016
UEFA Europa League: 2016–17; runner-up: 2020–21

Ivory Coast
Africa Cup of Nations: 2015

Individual
CAF Team of the Year: 2016, 2017, 2018
UEFA Europa League Squad of the Season: 2016–17
IFFHS CAF Men's Team of the Decade 2011–2020

References

External links

 Eric Bailly profile on Manchester United official website
 
 
 
 
 

1994 births
Living people
People from Bingerville
Ivorian footballers
Ivory Coast international footballers
Association football defenders
RCD Espanyol B footballers
RCD Espanyol footballers
Villarreal CF players
Manchester United F.C. players
Olympique de Marseille players
Segunda División B players
La Liga players
Premier League players
Ligue 1 players
2015 Africa Cup of Nations players
2017 Africa Cup of Nations players
2021 Africa Cup of Nations players
Africa Cup of Nations-winning players
Ivorian expatriate footballers
Expatriate footballers in England
Expatriate footballers in Spain
Expatriate footballers in France
Ivorian expatriate sportspeople in England
Ivorian expatriate sportspeople in Spain
Footballers from Abidjan
Footballers at the 2020 Summer Olympics
Olympic footballers of Ivory Coast
UEFA Europa League winning players